Luís Miguel Castelo Santos (born 20 January 2000) is a Portuguese professional footballer who plays as a winger for Boavista.

Club career
Santos is a youth product of CADE, Sporting, Leiria, Tomar and Boavista. He was promoted to the senior team of Boavista for the beginning of the 2021-22 season. He made his debut for Boavista in a 3-1 Primeira Liga loss to S.L. Benfica on 4 July 2020. He joined Trofense on loan in February 2021 for the second half of the Campeonato de Portugal.

References

External links
 
 
 ZeroZero Profile

2000 births
Living people
People from Entroncamento
Association football wingers
Portuguese footballers
Boavista F.C. players
C.D. Trofense players
Primeira Liga players
Campeonato de Portugal (league) players
Sportspeople from Santarém District